Calimera (Griko:  lit. 'good morning'), is a small town of 6,753 inhabitants (2021) in the Grecìa Salentina area of the Salento peninsula in Italy, located between Gallipoli and Otranto. It belongs to the province of Lecce.

The inhabitants of Calimera, alongside Italian, also speak Griko, a Greek dialect. The language, folklore, traditions and history of Calimera, like those of the eight other cities in the area called "Salentine Greece", reveal significant Greek influences over the course of time, presumably from the time of the Byzantine control, or even the ancient Magna Graecia colonisation in the 8th century BCE.

In the park, there is a small monument containing an ancient Attic burial stone, given by the city of Athens to Calimera in 1960. At the top of this monument is a motto, referring to the burial stone: "Zeni su en ise ettù sti Kalimera" (in Greek script: Τσένη 'σού 'εν είσαι ετού στη Καλημέρα), meaning "You are not a stranger here in Calimera", which underlines the close relationship and common origins of Calimera with the rest of Greek civilisation.

See also
Magna Graecia
Griko people
Griko language
Greeks in Italy
Ghetonia

External links
 Community of Calimera, in Italian

Cities and towns in Apulia
Grecìa Salentina
Localities of Salento